Marie-Rose Léodille Delaunay also called Mme Belmour-Lepine (1827-1906) was a Haitian educator.

She founded the l'Institution Mont-Carmel in 1850, and was its manager until 1903. This was the first secular secondary educational school for girls in Haiti. It was a pioneer institution as the first secondary educational school for girls in Haiti. President Petion did establish a girls school under the management of Madame Drury in 1816, and Juliette Bussière Laforest-Courtois managed a private school open to girls in 1818-1828, but these had been temporary basic educational schools, and the Haitian government had not even formed any policy around girls education until 1848, after which the first pioneer educational institutions for girls were founded.

See also
 Education in Haiti

References
 
 Noces d'or de Monsieur L. C. Lhérisson (portrait-essai-critique).: Trois grandes études de Christophonte sur l'homme et l'oeuvre en Mr. C. Lhérisson ...Prosper Chrisphonte. Imprimerie Telhomme, 1939
 Maurice Dartigue, L'Enseignement en Haïti (1804 - 1938)

1827 births
1906 deaths
19th-century Haitian educators
19th-century Haitian women